Baldric of Noyon was the forty-second bishop of Tournai (1099–1112). A chronicle of Arras and Cambrai has mistakenly been attributed to him. His surviving acta include the charter of 1105 by which he awarded the right of presentment for Tielt to the chapter of St Salvator in Harelbeke.

References

Bishops of Tournai
1112 deaths